Hyponymy and hypernymy are semantic relations between a term belonging in a set that is defined by another term and the latter. In other words, the relationship of a subtype (hyponym) and the supertype (also called umbrella term, blanket term, or hypernym). 
The semantic field of the hyponym is included within that of the hypernym. For example, pigeon, crow, and eagle are all hyponyms of bird, their hypernym.

Hyponyms and hypernyms 
In linguistics, semantics, general semantics, and ontologies, hyponymy shows the relationship between a generic term (hypernym) and a specific instance of it (hyponym). A hyponym is a word or phrase whose semantic field is more specific than its hypernym. The semantic field of a hypernym, also known as a superordinate, is broader than that of a hyponym. An approach to the relationship between hyponyms and hypernyms is to view a hypernym as consisting of hyponyms. This, however, becomes more difficult with abstract words such as imagine, understand and knowledge. While hyponyms are typically used to refer to nouns, it can also be used on other parts of speech.  Like nouns, hypernyms in verbs are words that refer to a broad category of actions. For example, verbs such as stare, gaze, view and peer can also be considered hyponyms of the verb look, which is their hypernym.

Hypernyms and hyponyms are asymmetric. Hyponymy can be tested by substituting X and Y in the sentence "X is a kind of Y" and determining if it makes sense.  For example, "A screwdriver is a kind of tool" makes sense, but not "A tool is a kind of screwdriver".

Strictly speaking, the meaning relation between hyponyms and hypernyms applies to lexical items of the same word class (that is, part of speech), and holds between senses rather than words. For instance, the word screwdriver used in the previous example refers to the screwdriver tool, and not to the screwdriver drink.

Hyponymy is a transitive relation: if X is a hyponym of Y, and Y is a hyponym of Z, then X is a hyponym of Z. For example, violet is a hyponym of purple and purple is a hyponym of color; therefore violet is a hyponym of color. A word can be both a hypernym and a hyponym: for example purple is a hyponym of color but itself is a hypernym of the broad spectrum of shades of purple between the range of crimson and violet.

The hierarchical structure of semantic fields can be mostly seen in hyponymy. They could be observed from top to bottom, where the higher level is more general and the lower level is more specific. For example, living things will be the highest level followed by plants and animals, and the lowest level may comprise dog, cat and wolf.

Under the relations of hyponymy and incompatibility, taxonomic hierarchical structures too can be formed. It consists of two relations; the first one being exemplified in "An X is a Y" (simple hyponymy) while the second relation is "An X is a kind/type of Y". The second relation is said to be more discriminating and can be classified more specifically under the concept of taxonomy.

Co-hyponyms
If the hypernym Z consists of hyponyms X and Y, X and Y are identified as co-hyponyms (cohyponyms), also known as coordinate terms. Co-hyponyms are labelled as such when separate hyponyms share the same hypernym but are not hyponyms of one another, unless they happen to be synonymous. For example, screwdriver, scissors, knife, and hammer are all co-hyponyms of one another and hyponyms of tool, but not hyponyms of one another: *"A hammer is a type of knife" is false.

Co-hyponyms are often but not always related to one another by the relation of incompatibility. For example, apple, peach and plum are co-hyponyms of fruit. However, an apple is not a peach, which is also not a plum. Thus, they are incompatible. Nevertheless, co-hyponyms are not necessarily incompatible in all senses. A queen and mother are both hyponyms of woman but there is nothing preventing the queen from being a mother. This shows that compatibility may be relevant.

Autohyponyms 

A word is an autohyponym if it is used for both a hypernym and its hyponym. For example, the word dog describes both the species Canis familiaris and male individuals of Canis familiaris, so it is possible to say "That dog isn't a dog, it's a bitch" ("That hypernym Z isn't a hyponym Z, it's a hyponym Y"). The term "autohyponym" was coined by linguist Laurence R. Horn in a 1984 paper, Ambiguity, negation, and the London School of Parsimony. Linguist Ruth Kempson had already observed that if there are hyponyms for one part of a set but not another, the hypernym can complement the existing hyponym by being used for the remaining part. For example, fingers describe all digits on a hand, but the existence of the word thumb for the first finger means that fingers can also be used for "non-thumb digits on a hand". Autohyponymy is also called "vertical polysemy".

Horn called this "licensed polysemy", but found that autohyponyms also formed even when there is no other hyponym. Yankee is autohyponymous because it is a hyponym (native of New England) and its hypernym (native of the United States), even though there is no other hyponym of Yankee (as native of the United States) that means "not a native of New England". Similarly, the verb to drink (a beverage) is a hypernym for to drink (an alcoholic beverage).

In some cases, autohyponyms duplicate existing, distinct hyponyms. The hypernym "smell" (to emit any smell) has a hyponym "stink" (to emit a bad smell), but is autohyponymous because "smell" can also mean "to emit a bad smell", even though there is no "to emit a smell that isn't bad" hyponym.

Etymology 
Both hyperonym and hypernym are in use in linguistics. The form hypernym takes the -o- of hyponym as a part of hypo in the same way as in the contrast between hypertension and hypotension. However, etymologically the -o- is part of the Greek stem ónoma. In other combinations with this stem, e.g. synonym, it is never elided. Therefore, hyperonym is etymologically more faithful than hypernym. Hyperonymy is used, for instance, by John Lyons, who does not mention hypernymy and prefers superordination. The nominalization hyperonymy is rarely used, because the neutral term to refer to the relationship is hyponymy. A practical reason to prefer hyperonym is that hypernym is in its spoken form hard to distinguish from hyponym in most dialects of English.

Usage 
Computer science often terms this relationship an "is-a" relationship. For example, the phrase "Red is-a color" can be used to describe the hyponymic relationship between red and color.

Hyponymy is the most frequently encoded relation among synsets used in lexical databases such as WordNet. These semantic relations can also be used to compare semantic similarity by judging the distance between two synsets and to analyse anaphora.

As a hypernym can be understood as a more general word than its hyponym, the relation is used in semantic compression by generalization to reduce a level of specialization.

The notion of hyponymy is particularly relevant to language translation, as hyponyms are very common across languages. An English-to-Japanese translator presented with a phrase containing the English word brother would have to choose which Japanese word equivalent to use. This would be difficult, because abstract information (such as the speakers' relative ages) is often not available during machine translation.

See also 
 Contrast set
 Has-a
 Genus proximum
 Meronymy and holonymy
 -onym
 Polysemy
 Subcategory
 Synonym
 Taxonomy
 WordNet (a semantic lexicon for the English language, which puts words in semantic relations to each other, mainly by using the concepts hypernym and hyponym)

Notes

References

Sources

External links 

 Hypernym at Everything2.com

Hierarchy
Semantic relations

de:Oberbegriff